The Spindrift Stakes was an American Thoroughbred horse race run annually between 1885 and 1909 at Sheepshead Bay Race Track at Sheepshead Bay, Brooklyn, New York City. A race for three-year-olds, it was contested on dirt over a distance of 1¼ miles (10 furlongs) from 1885–1892 and at 1⅛ miles (9 furlongs) from 1893 through 1909.

The inaugural running took place on July 11, 1885 and was won by St. Augustine, a John Alcock trained colt owned by George Lorillard. The final running of the Spindrift took place on July 7, 1909 and was won by the Oneck Stable's Fashion Plate, trained by William Karrick.

The 1911–1912 statewide shutdown of horse racing
On June 11, 1908, the Republican controlled New York Legislature under Governor Charles Evans Hughes passed the Hart–Agnew anti-betting legislation. The owners of Sheepshead Bay Race Track, and other racing facilities in New York State, struggled to stay in business without income from betting. Racetrack operators had no choice but to drastically reduce the purse money being paid out which resulted in the Spindrift Stakes offering a purse in 1909 that was nearly one-tenth of what it had been in earlier years. These small purses made horse racing unprofitable and impossible for even the most successful horse owners to continue in business. As such, for the 1910 racing season management of the Sheepshead Bay facility dropped some of its minor stakes races and used the purse money to bolster its most important events.

In spite of strong opposition by prominent owners such as August Belmont Jr. and Harry Payne Whitney, reform legislators were not happy when they learned that betting was still going on at racetracks between individuals and they had further restrictive legislation passed by the New York Legislature in 1910. The Agnew–Perkins Law, a series of four bills and recorded as the Executive Liability Act, made it possible for racetrack owners and members of its board of directors to be fined and imprisoned if anyone was found betting, even privately, anywhere on their premises.  After a 1911 amendment to the law that would limit the liability of owners and directors was defeated in the Legislature, every racetrack in New York State shut down. As a result, after 1909 the Spindrift Stakes was never run again.

Owners, whose horses of racing age had nowhere to go, began sending them, their trainers and their jockeys to race in England and France. Many horses ended their racing careers there and a number remained to become an important part of the European horse breeding industry. Thoroughbred Times reported that  more than 1,500 American horses were sent overseas between 1908 and 1913 and of them at least 24 were either past, present, or future Champions. When a February 21, 1913 ruling by the New York Supreme Court, Appellate Division Court saw horse racing return in 1913. However, it was too late for the Sheepshead Bay horse racing facility and it never reopened.

Records
Speed record:
 1:51.80 – Fashion Plate (1909) (at  miles)
 2:09.40 – Sir John (1890) (at  miles)

Most wins by a jockey:
 2 – Henry Spencer (1899, 1900)

Most wins by a trainer:
 4 – James G. Rowe, Sr. (1888, 1903, 1906, 1907)

Most wins by an owner:
 2 – Dwyer Brothers Stable (1887, 1890)
 2 – Samuel S. Brown & John W. Rogers (1892, 1893)
 2 – James R. Keene (1906, 1907)

Winners

References

Discontinued horse races in New York City
Sheepshead Bay Race Track
Recurring sporting events established in 1886
Recurring events disestablished in 1909
1886 establishments in New York (state)
1909 disestablishments in New York (state)